Redondo Union High School (RUHS) is a public high school in Redondo Beach, California.

Redondo Union High School is a part of the Redondo Beach Unified School District.
All residents of Redondo Beach are zoned to Redondo Union. In addition, residents of Hermosa Beach may choose to attend Redondo Union or Mira Costa High School of the Manhattan Beach Unified School District.

With a large teaching staff, RUHS is a comprehensive high school offering various curricula for college-bound students, as well as diversified career path and extracurricular programs.

History

Redondo Union High School was organized in the summer of 1905. The first classes were held in two upstairs rooms of the Masonic Building in Redondo Beach. In December of that same year, a site known as Old Chautauqua Place was selected as the location for the school.

Today, the spacious campus of more than  extends from Pacific Coast Highway to Prospect Avenue. RUHS is said to be the second-largest high school (by area) in the state and the third-largest in the country.

Redondo Union High School has many traditions and much history. A few highlights follow.

1905: RUHS opens with one teacher and 10 pupils.

1906: School colors of red and white are chosen.

1911: The tradition begins of passing the mantle to the junior with the highest academic ranking.

1912: High school accredited.

1915: The first Pilot is printed.

1916: An open house is held for new buildings and the new auditorium.

1920: The first issue of the High Tide is published.

1923: The High Tide becomes one of the only high school newspapers in the nation to be published weekly.

1929: The Alma Mater is written by Charlotte E. Cheney, ’26.

1939: The Science Building is dedicated. Residents of Manhattan Beach attended Redondo Union until 1950, when Mira Costa High School opened.

1952: The campus is expanded with the addition of many new classroom buildings.

1972: The new auditorium is completed.

1980: Redondo Union High School celebrates its 75th anniversary with an all-alumni event at the Seaside Lagoon.

1983: Redondo Union High School absorbs students from Aviation High School which is closed due to budgetary constraints.

1988: RUHS is named a California Distinguished School.

1989: RUHS is named a National Exemplary School.

Redondo Union High School was a part of the South Bay Union High School District until 1993, when it dissolved.

1995: The Redondo Union High School Alumni Association is formed.

1996: For the second time in a decade RUHS is named a California Distinguished School.

1997: The RUHS Alumni Walk is constructed and dedicated.

2000: Redondo Union High School celebrates its 95th anniversary with an all-alumni event at the Seaside Lagoon; Girls’ golf team wins CIF Championship.

2001: Beach Cities robotics team wins National Championship. Boys basketball team wins CIF Championship.

2002: RUHS boys’ and girls’ basketball teams both win CIF Division II-A Championships; girls’ team advances to the state finals in Sacramento.

2004: RUHS Boys' Tennis win CIF Division IV Tennis Championships.

2005: Redondo Union High School begins a year-long celebration of its 100 years of history from 1905 to 2005.

2006: Girls' volleyball team upsets rival Mira Costa High School in the CIF division 1-AA championships.

2007: Redondo Union High School's One Hundredth Class Graduates.

2009: Academic Decathlon goes to the California State Competition.

2010: Beach Cities robotics team wins World Championship.

2010: RUHS Girls' basketball team wins the CIF.

2011: Redondo Union Girls' Cross Country rank 10th in the nation at Nike Cross Nationals.

2012: Academic Decathlon goes to the California State Competition and sets a new school record.

2013: RUHS Boys' Basketball defeats College Park to win the Division II CIF State Championship.

2014: Amber Gore wins  Cross Country Division II CIF State Championship.

2014: Girls' Volleyball wins state open division title.

2015: Girls' Basketball wins a CIF-SS Division 2 title.

2015: Boys' Baseball wins first CIF title in Division III to mark 100 years of Sea Hawk Baseball.

2015: Girls' Volleyball repeats as CIF State Champions.

2015: RUHS Marching Band & Guard wins first place in CSBC in Division 4A for their show "Above and Beyond".

2016: Boys' Baseball repeats CIF title in Division III.

2018: Girls Basketball wins state Division II title.

2019: Girls Volleyball wins the CIF State Championship.

2019: Model United Nations wins 1st place at the National High School Model United Nations Conference in New York City.

2022: Both Boys and Girls Soccer win CIF Southern Section Division 2 Championships on their home stadium on the same day.

Advanced courses
Redondo offers Advanced Placement classes in:
English Language,
English Literature,
Biology,
Chemistry,
Environmental Science,
Physics 1,
Physics 2,
European History,
United States History,
Government and Politics: United States,
Psychology,
Calculus AB,
Calculus BC,
Statistics,
Studio Art,
French,
Spanish Language,
Computer Science A,
Computer Science Principles,
Art History,
Macroeconomics, and
Music Theory.

Honors courses
Redondo offers honors courses in Biology, Chemistry, English 9, and English 10.

College and Career Center 
The College and Career Center aims to provide students with the most up to date and comprehensive collection of information regarding career, education, financial aid, and scholarship information.

Sports

Fall sports
Boys Beach Volleyball (2013)
Cross-Country (Co-ed)
Football
Boys Water Polo
Girls Tennis
Girls Volleyball
Girls Golf
Surfing
Cheerleading
Marching Band/Dance Guard

Winter sports
Boys Basketball
Girls Basketball
Wrestling (Co-ed)
Girls Water Polo
Boys Soccer
Girls Soccer
Surfing (Co-ed)
Rugby

Spring sports
Track (Co-ed)
Baseball
Boys Golf
Boys Lacrosse
Girls Lacrosse
Softball
Swimming (Co-ed)
Boys Tennis
Boys Volleyball

Programs and people

Beach Cities Robotics
The robotics club at Mira Costa High School works with Redondo Union High School as well as other southern California schools to create the Beach Cities Robotics club. The club participates in the organization FIRST (For Inspiration and Recognition of Science and Technology), a nationwide organization that fosters the advancement of science and technology through several different programs for all grade levels, holding robotic competitions year round internationally. During the main event, FIRST Robotics Competition, the team has six weeks to design, build, and test a robot according to a challenge that changes each year. Students participating in the robotics club will gain knowledge in engineering, physics, math, programming, public relations, teamwork, and many other skills.

Beach Cities Robotics has won numerous awards since starting in 1997 and won 1st place at the international finals in 2001 against over 1000 other teams. Other awards include Engineering Inspiration Award at the Arizona Regional Competition in 2003, the Regional Chairman's Award at the Southern California Regional Competition in 2004, and the Engineering Inspiration Award at the Southern California Regional Competition in 2005. In 2010, the team won the FIRST Championships, in Saint Louis, Missouri. As well as, winning the Los Angeles Regional Competition in 2014, which is 2nd largest robotics competition in the state of California.

Band program
Every fall the Sea Hawk Band and Guard competes in field show competitions. In the Spring the RUHS Jazz Ensemble competes in festivals at Royal High School, Mayfair High School, and Westlake High School.

In 2005, RUHS took in a new band called the RUHS Wind Ensemble for advanced players.

In the 2010 Marching Band season, the band took 1st place in the Southern California Judging Association Championships in Division 3A. The RUHS marching band qualified for the SCSBOA Championships this past 2010 season and received 10th place out of 12 other marching bands.

During the 2011 season, the RUHS Percussion line competed in its first ever DAC competition. The Percussion line placed 5th out of 7 other percussion lines and placed 5th again out of 14 other percussion lines overall.

The theme for the 2012 year was called "Variations on a Korean Folk Song" arranged by Mike Lloyd. The original composition is by John Barnes Chance. 
In the 2013 season, the marching band performed "Carmen" composed by Georges Bizet.

For the 2014 concert season, the band is playing selections from Aaron Copland's "Simple Gifts." For their 2014 field production, the band performed an original show designed by their new director titled "007 Legacy". In the 2014 season, the band made it to semi-finals in which they placed 12th in SCJA.

In the 2015 season, their show entitled "Above and Beyond". The band took their show to semi-finals in which they placed 2nd and then to championships which they were crowned Division 4A Champions in the SCJA circuit. The Band and Dance Guard were honored by the city of Redondo Beach on January 19, 2016, with a special parade to city hall resulting in the city call that date, Redondo Union High School Marching Band and Guard DAY.

In the 2016 season, the band and guard performed "The Insanity of an Imaginary World", a steampunk take on the classic Alice in Wonderland. The band placed 2nd in the CSBC Division 4A Championships, continuing on to the CSBC Grand Championships, where they became the 2016 CSBC Bronze Medalists.

In March 2017 the concert band and wind ensemble traveled to New York City to perform at Carnegie Hall. The band's current director is Ray Vizcarra.
In the 2017 season, the Seahawk Marching Band and Guard made waves with the performance of their field show Atlantis. They made it to the CSBC Grand Championships, moving on to a spellbinding night premiere. Redondo then placed in the top five at fifth place. Despite not making it into the top three, the win was something of an accomplishment after the rough seasons before 2015.

In the 2018 season, the marching band performed their show titled, "Pure Imagination," which ended up placing 5th in CSBC Division 6A, and did not advance to the CSBC Grand Championships.

In 2019, the marching band rebounded with their production titled, "Savage," which ended up finishing 3rd in CSBC Division 5A, and went on to finish 4th in the CSBC Grand Championships.

After not participating in the 2020 CSBC season due to its cancelation from the COVID-19 pandemic, the band came back strong in 2021 with their production titled, "Charmed," coming 1st in CSBC Division 4A and finishing 4th in the CSBC Grand Championships with a Redondo record score of 92.1.

Theatre program
Every year at Redondo, the Theatre Art Department puts on several productions, including a spring musical. Past productions include: The Complete Works of William Shakespeare (Abridged), How to Succeed in Business Without Really Trying, The Ninth Guest, Anything Goes, 12 Angry Jurors, The Iliad and The Odyssey and All of Greek Mythology in 99 Minutes or Less, Seussical, Grease, Little Shop of Horrors, Cabaret, MacBeth, Thoroughly Modern Millie, A Christmas Carol, Beauty and the Beast, The Dining Room, an adaptation of High School Musical, Shrek, 25th Annual Putnam County Spelling Bee, Letters to Sala, Crazy for You, Into the Woods, The Drowsy Chaperone, The Crucible, Emma: A Pop Musical, Clue (On Stage), and The Addams Family.

Facilities

Sports

2 Indoor Gyms:  Redondo Union High School has a large gym and a small gym.
14 lane Swimming Pool
Football Field a.k.a. Sea Hawk Bowl.
Lacrosse Field
Wrestling Room
Track
Two Weight-Training and Conditioning Facilities
Tennis Courts
Volleyball Courts
Baseball Fields
Softball Fields
Soccer Fields
Golf Practice Course

Arts
Video Production Facilities
Ceramics
Fine Arts Facilities
Dance Room
Band Room
Choir Room
Drama Room

Other resources
Library
Computer Lab
College/Career Center

Media appearances

Film
The movie The Hot Chick was filmed here.
Kurt Russell wears an RUHS Senior class ring in the 1988 film Tequila Sunrise

Television
In Season 3, Episode 27 of The Beverly Hillbillies, Alan Reed Jr., as a beatnik, stepped out of a car in the Clampetts' driveway, stared at the front of the mansion and said, "Man! This place looks like Redondo High!"

Notable alumni
 Dez Cadena - Singer for Black Flag
 Iris Cummings - Aviator and competition swimmer
 Keith Ellison - NFL-Buffalo Bills
 Kevin Ellison - University of Southern California Trojans
 Morgan Ensberg - MLB- New York Yankees
 Carla Esparza (née: O'Connell) - Professional mixed martial artist, inaugural UFC Strawweight Champion (2014)
 Lynette "Squeaky" Fromme - Member of the Manson family
 Nona Gaye - Recording artist and daughter of Marvin Gaye
 Lynn Hoyem - NFL-Dallas Cowboys and Philadelphia Eagles
 Jermar Jefferson - NFL player
 Charles Lindbergh Sr. - Famous pilot (briefly attended and transferred out)
 Traci Lords - Actress (dropped out at age 15)
 Demi Moore - Actress (transferred to Fairfax High School after freshman year)
 Ty Page - Professional skateboarder
 Donald Peterman - Academy Award-nominated cinematographer
 The Smothers Brothers - Comedians 
 Ted Stevens - Former United States Senator for Alaska
 Dijon Thompson - Former NBA player with the Phoenix Suns and Atlanta Hawks, currently playing for Hapoel Jerusalem of the Israeli Basketball Premier League.
 Byron McMackin - Drummer for Pennywise
Sean Rosenthal - Olympic Beach Volleyball player
 Dominik Eberle - NFL Kicker

Notes

External links 
 RUHS website
 Redondo Unified School District Website
 RUHS Student Newspaper
 RUHS Theatre Arts
 Cross Country and Track and Field
 RUHS Alumni Association Website
 Beach Cities Robotics
 RUHS Class of 1969
 RUHS Band
RUHS Graduation Requirements
 RUHS Registration Information
 RUHS Key Club
 RUHS Student Broadcast
 RUHS Associated Student Body 
 RUHS Parent Teacher Student Association 

High schools in Los Angeles County, California
Public high schools in California
Redondo Beach, California
1905 establishments in California